The Concert is a live album by Barbra Streisand, released in September 1994 through Columbia Records. The album reached a peak position of number ten on the Billboard 200. The Concert was certified platinum in Australia, Canada and the United States. The song "Ordinary Miracles" was released as a CD-single by Columbia Records including a studio version of the track produced by Walter Afanasieff. It was arranged and conducted by Marvin Hamlisch. An abbreviated version of the album titled The Concert: Highlights was also released with a different cover art and was certified gold by the RIAA, while the double album received a triple-platinum certification.

Track listing
Disc 1/Act I
 "Overture" – 5:47
 "As If We Never Said Goodbye" – 4:20 (Andrew Lloyd Webber, Don Black, Christopher Hampton, A. Powers)
 Opening Remarks – 1:13
 "I'm Still Here/Everybody Says Don't/Don't Rain on My Parade" (Stephen Sondheim) – 4:25
 "Can't Help Lovin' That Man" – 4:29 (Jerome Kern, Oscar Hammerstein II)
 "I'll Know" (with Marlon Brando) – 2:48 (Frank Loesser)
 "People" – 4:18 (Jule Styne, Bob Merrill)
 "Lover Man" – 1:17 (Jimmy Davis, Roger J. Ramirez, Jimmy Sherman)
 Therapist Dialogue #1 – 1:24
 "Will He Like Me?" – 1:59 (Sheldon Harnick, Jerry Bock)
 Therapist Dialogue #2 – 1:00
 "He Touched Me" – 2:51 (Milton Schafer, Ira Levin)
 "Evergreen" – 3:17 (Barbra Streisand, Paul Williams)
 Therapist Dialogue #3 – 1:54
 "The Man That Got Away" – 4:05 (Harold Arlen, Ira Gershwin)
 "On a Clear Day (You Can See Forever)" – 3:29 (Burton Lane, Alan Jay Lerner)

Disc 2/Act II
 "Entr'acte" – 3:02
 "The Way We Were" – 3:15 (Marvin Hamlisch, Alan Bergman, Marilyn Bergman)
 "You Don't Bring Me Flowers" – 4:44 (Neil Diamond, Alan Bergman, Marilyn Bergman)
 "Lazy Afternoon" – 4:30 (John LaTouche, Jerome Moross)
 Disney Medley: "Once Upon a Dream/When You Wish Upon a Star/Someday My Prince Will Come" – 5:07
 "Not While I'm Around" (Sondheim) – 3:03
 "Ordinary Miracles" – 4:35 (Marvin Hamlisch, Alan Bergman, Marilyn Bergman)
 Yentl Medley: "Where Is It Written/Papa, Can You Hear Me/Will Someone Ever Look at Me That Way/A Piece of Sky" – 9:18 (Michel Legrand, Alan Bergman, Marilyn Bergman)
 "Happy Days Are Here Again" – 3:40 (Milton Ager, Jack Yellen)
 "My Man" – 3:18 (Maurice Yvain, Channing Pollock, Albert Willemetz, Jacques Charles)
 "For All We Know" – 5:04 (John Frederick Coots, Sam M. Lewis)
 "Somewhere" – 5:15 (Leonard Bernstein, Sondheim)

Charts and certifications

Weekly charts

Year-end charts

Certifications and sales

}
}

}

References

1994 live albums
Albums recorded at Madison Square Garden
Barbra Streisand live albums
Columbia Records live albums